Rounds Mountain, is a prominent peak in the Taconic Mountains of western Massachusetts and adjacent New York. The west side of the mountain and summit are located in New York; the east side is located within Massachusetts. The summit a bald; the slopes are wooded with northern hardwood tree species. It is notable for its views of the Hudson River Valley to the west and the Green River and Kinderhook Creek valleys of Hancock, Massachusetts to the east. The  Taconic Crest Trail traverses the mountain. Much of the upper slopes and summit are within protected conservation land.

Geography
Rounds Mountain is located within Stephentown, New York and Hancock, Massachusetts. It is flanked to the south across the Kinderhook Creek valley by Poppy Mountain and to the southeast by Potter Mountain. The Taconic Ridge continues north from Rounds Mountain as Misery Mountain. The west side of Rounds Mountain drains into East Brook, then Kinderhook Creek, thence into the Hudson River and Long Island Sound. The east side drains into Kinderhook Creek.

References
 Massachusetts Trail Guide (2004). Boston: Appalachian Mountain Club.

References

External links
 Taconic Hiking Club

Mountains of Berkshire County, Massachusetts
Mountains of Rensselaer County, New York
Taconic Mountains
Mountains of New York (state)